Nicolas Joseph Caleb Wilson (born June 11, 1990) is an American politician and former public defender best known for competing on the reality competition show Survivor. He was voted the winner of the show's thirty-seventh season, Survivor: David vs. Goliath, in 2018, and returned in 2020 for the fortieth season, Survivor: Winners at War, to compete against former winners in the Survivor franchise, where he would finish in seventh place.

Wilson, a Republican, won an election to become a state representative of the 82nd District in the Kentucky House of Representatives in 2022.

Early life
Wilson grew up in Williamsburg, Kentucky. Wilson's parents divorced while he was growing up. His grandmother helped raise him and his four siblings while they stayed with their father. He became the first person in his family to graduate from college when he completed a Bachelor's degree in political science from the University of Kentucky.  At Kentucky, he became a member of Kappa Sigma (Beta-Nu) fraternity. He eventually went on to the University of Alabama School of Law and graduated to become a public defender. While at Alabama, he lost his mother when she died due to a drug overdose.

Survivor

David vs. Goliath
As part of the original David tribe, Wilson began his game with a bit of a rocky start, being seen as someone who was lazy and sat around camp all day. In particular, he became targeted by tribemates Pat Cusack and Carl Boudreaux. However, Wilson was spared from the chopping block of the first tribal council when Cusack was medically evacuated following the season's first immunity challenge. Afterward, Wilson immediately shifted his focus and became an aggressive alliance-builder, crafting one-on-one allegiances with several players in the game. In the next Tribal Council, Wilson voted with Christian Hubicki (with whom he'd founded the Mason-Dixon Alliance), Elizabeth Olson (together, the Thoroughbreds), Gabby Pascuzzi and Lyrsa Torres to send Jessica Peet out of the game. Wilson also forged a friendship with Davie Rickenbacker during this time.

A tribe swap occurred on Day Ten, putting Wilson on the Jabeni tribe with Torres and three former Goliaths: Natalie Cole, Mike White and Angelina Keeley. During his time on Jabeni, Wilson aligned with White and Keeley, and together the three of them ousted Cole (a former Goliath) and Torres (a former David) at the next two Tribal Councils. This alliance would become a crucial fulcrum in the rest of the season.

The merge occurred with thirteen players, forming the Kalokalo tribe. From that point, Wilson became part of an alliance with Hubicki and Pascuzzi from the Davids, as well as White, Alec Merlino and Alison Raybould from the Goliaths. Olson became the first person unanimously voted from the merge. Afterwards, Wilson found a vote stealer advantage. At the next Tribal Council, he voted with the Davids to blindside Goliath John Hennigan with a hidden immunity idol play and minority vote split. The former Goliaths remained in control of the numbers with a 6–5 advantage, but Wilson used his advantage along with Boudreaux's idol nullifier to send Goliath Dan Rengering to the jury. At the next Tribal Council, Merlino was unanimously sent to the jury, giving the surviving David players the majority.

At this point, Wilson and most of the Davids sought to target Raybould, but tribal lines were crossed when Hubicki and Pascuzzi flipped on their original alliances to orchestrate Boudreaux's elimination, leaving Wilson out of the vote. Frustrated by their betrayal, Wilson sought revenge. He and Keeley won the Family Visit in the next reward challenge, and together they selected White and Davie Rickenbacker to accompany them. They forged a Final Four deal on the reward, with the idea that Hubicki would be the next target. However, Hubicki sensed the tide had turned on him and played an immunity idol, voiding the votes against him and causing Pascuzzi (who had been attempting to engineer Hubicki's elimination) to be sent to the jury. Hubicki's safety would prove short-lived, as he was soon eliminated at the following Tribal Council.

At the Final Six, Wilson won his first immunity challenge of the season. During this time, he strengthened his bonds with Keeley and White, agreeing to a Final Three deal. Wilson once more attempted to target Raybould, but Rickenbacker was eliminated instead, having been seen as a bigger threat by White and Keeley. Furious at Rickenbacker's boot at the hands of his own allies, Wilson was now the last David standing. However, he secured his safety within the game by winning the next immunity challenge, finally ousting Raybould from the game as a result. He then went on to win the final immunity challenge of the season, becoming the only player from the season to win multiple immunities as well as guaranteeing his spot in the Final Tribal Council. Wilson selected Keeley to sit alongside him at the Final Three, forcing Kay and White to compete for the final slot via the Fire-Making Challenge. White won, cementing the Jabeni Three's final pact as well as sending Kay to the jury. Since the introduction of the final four forced fire-making challenge, Wilson is the first castaway to win the Final Immunity Challenge, not compete in the fire-making tiebreaker, and go on to win the season.

During the Final Tribal Council, Wilson was praised for his social and strategic acumen as well as his immunity wins, but was criticized for his game peaking too early, whereas much of the game's final maneuvers were credited to White. However, Wilson highlighted on the bonds he'd made with the other players, citing his role as an underdog who represented the spirit of the season's theme. Wilson's impassioned speech, which neatly outlined his gameplay, swayed seven of the ten jurors to vote for him, giving him the title of Sole Survivor.

With his victory, Wilson became the ninth winner in Survivor history to win the game while receiving zero votes cast against them the entire game.

Winners at War
He returned to compete on the show's first all-winners season, Survivor: Winners at War. Wilson was initially a part of the Dakal tribe. While he would receive one vote in both the first two Tribal Councils he attended, he was not voted out. At the merge, Wilson found himself on the bottom for the first couple of votes, before finding himself in a good spot. He won a crucial immunity challenge at the Final Seven, which was needed as he was the target. At the Final Six (before the last Edge of Extinction re-entry challenge), Wilson received an advantage from Natalie Anderson (who was on Edge of Extinction), which allowed him to give another player a disadvantage in the immunity challenge, and he would need to pay six Fire Tokens to purchase this. Wilson, who had four tokens, got two tokens from Michele Fitzgerald and purchased the advantage. He used the advantage against Ben Driebergen at the immunity challenge. However, Wilson was voted out that night, as Sarah Lacina felt that his underdog story made him a threat. Wilson was eliminated from the game after failing to win the final re-entry Edge of Extinction challenge.

At the Final Tribal Council, Wilson voted for Tony Vlachos to win, which he did in a 12-4-0 vote, making him the series' second two-time winner.

Career
His mother's passing helped Wilson understand that he could use his platform as a public defender more than his own personal success. He felt a responsibility to return to his hometown and help his community. Upon graduation, Wilson became a public defender in his hometown. His main focus is fighting the opioid epidemic. In January 2019, he started a new position with the Kentucky Commonwealth's Attorney Office.

2022 Kentucky House of Representatives election
In November 2021, Wilson announced that he was running for a seat in the Kentucky House of Representatives, for the 82nd District, which includes his hometown of Williamsburg. Wilson, who is a Republican, was endorsed by retiring incumbent Regina Huff. Wilson was elected after running unopposed.

Personal life
On January 14, 2019, Wilson received the key to the city of Williamsburg and was given his own day, "Nick Wilson Day" on January 16.

Wilson is married to Grisel Vilchez.

References

External links
Twitter
Inside Survivor bio
CBS bio

1990 births
Kentucky lawyers
Kentucky Republicans
Living people
People from Whitley County, Kentucky
Survivor (American TV series) winners
University of Kentucky alumni
University of Alabama alumni
Public defenders
Winners in the Survivor franchise
Republican Party members of the Kentucky House of Representatives
21st-century American politicians